Afghan Arabi is a breed of domesticated sheep found in Afghanistan.  They are a member of the fat-rump breeds of sheep.  The wool is carpet quality and the Afghan Arabi are raised for their meat.

Characteristics
Both sexes are polled (hornless) and have long pendulous ears. Typically, this breed is grey or black with white displayed on the face.

References

Sheep breeds
Sheep breeds originating in Afghanistan